Whittington may refer to the following places in Derbyshire:

Old Whittington, a town located to the north of Chesterfield
New Whittington, a village located to the north of Old Whittington
Whittington Moor, a town located to the south of the above